Fernando Scavasin (born November 24, 1984) is a Brazilian fencer.

Achievements

Pan American Games 
Guadalajara 2011: Bronze in the foil team event.
Toronto 2015: Silver in the foil team event.

References 

1984 births
Living people
Brazilian male foil fencers
Olympic fencers of Brazil
Fencers at the 2016 Summer Olympics
Pan American Games medalists in fencing
Pan American Games silver medalists for Brazil
South American Games gold medalists for Brazil
South American Games medalists in fencing
Fencers at the 2011 Pan American Games
Competitors at the 2010 South American Games
Medalists at the 2011 Pan American Games
Fencers at the 2015 Pan American Games
Medalists at the 2015 Pan American Games
21st-century Brazilian people